Occipitofrontal is a term relating to the occiput and the frontal direction, as in:

Occipitofrontal fasciculus, association fibers in the brain
Occipito-anterior form of cephalic presentation of birth